Costa Rica competed in the 2008 Summer Olympics, held in Beijing, People's Republic of China from August 8 to August 24, 2008. Eight Costa Rican representatives have qualified to compete in Beijing.

Athletics

Men

Women

Cycling

Road

Mountain biking

Swimming

Men

Women

Taekwondo

See also
Costa Rica at the 2007 Pan American Games
Costa Rica at the 2010 Central American and Caribbean Games

References

Nations at the 2008 Summer Olympics
2008
Olympics